Gordon Bell is a Canadian software developer and entrepreneur. He is one of the co-creators of the QNX microkernel real-time operating system.

QNX
Bell and Dan Dodge began the project while students at the University of Waterloo in 1980. Bell and Dodge incorporated Quantum Software Systems in the Ottawa suburb of Kanata, Ontario to develop and sell the operating system, originally called QUNIX. AT&T requested the name be changed to avoid encroaching on their UNIX trademark, so QUNIX was renamed QNX. The company name was later changed to QNX Software Systems. The first commercial version of QNX was released for the Intel 8088 central processing unit (CPU) in 1982.

In 2002, Bell and Dodge were acclaimed as Heroes of Manufacturing by Fortune magazine.

See also
 List of University of Waterloo people

References

External links

Living people
University of Waterloo alumni
Year of birth missing (living people)
Canadian technology company founders